Zè  is a town, arrondissement, and commune in the Atlantique Department of southern Benin. The commune covers an area of 543 square kilometres and as of 2013 had a population of 106,913 people.

References
  

Communes of Benin
Populated places in the Atlantique Department
Arrondissements of Benin